Harrison Dwith Róchez (born November 29, 1983) is a Belizean football midfielder who plays for the Honduran club Marathón that competes in the Liga Nacional de Honduras.

Club career
Róchez played for several local clubs in his native Belize, before moving to play in Honduras in 2007. He played for Platense and Necaxa before joining Marathón in December 2011.

International career
He made his debut for Belize in a June 2004 World Cup qualification match against Canada and, by January 2010, has earned 14 caps, playing in four World Cup qualifiers.

International goals
Scores and results list Belize's goal tally first.

Stats

References

External links
Picture - Belize Football

1983 births
Living people
People from Stann Creek District
Belizean footballers
Belize international footballers
Boca FC players
New Site Erei players
Wagiya FC players
Belizean expatriate footballers
Expatriate footballers in Honduras
Belizean expatriate sportspeople in Honduras
Premier League of Belize players
Liga Nacional de Fútbol Profesional de Honduras players
Deportes Savio players
Platense F.C. players
C.D. Marathón players
2005 UNCAF Nations Cup players
2007 UNCAF Nations Cup players
2009 UNCAF Nations Cup players
2013 Copa Centroamericana players
2013 CONCACAF Gold Cup players
2014 Copa Centroamericana players
Association football midfielders
Police United FC (Belize) players